Here Come the Marines is a 1952 comedy film starring The Bowery Boys. The film was released on June 29, 1952 by Monogram Pictures and is the twenty-sixth film in the series.

Plot
After Slip is drafted into the Marines, the rest of the gang volunteer so they can be with him. Sach gets in trouble for first impersonating a doctor and then, while serving kp duty, creating a bouillon capable of melting any known metal. When he's called into their colonel's office for punishment, Sach discovers that his father Horace 'Hard Head' Debussey Sr. served with the colonel in WWI and is subsequently promoted to sergeant.

Sergeant Sach draws the ire of his men through multiple drills and by constantly keeping them on their toes with a whistle. During a march, they find a soldier left for dead on the side of the road.  Slip discovers a playing card next to the marine and traces it to Jolly Joe Johnson's gambling house.  They  pay a visit to the casino & suspect that the gambling house is cheating after losing all of their money. Back on base, the boys attempt to have Sach busted back down to private by slipping what they assume to be an inert training bomb into his bed at night under the assumption he'll cause a ruckus and be punished. The MPs arrive with a captain who, after scolding Sach for not recognizing a dud, tosses the bomb out the barracks window where it promptly explodes. Sach is awarded a medal for heroism and promoted to staff sergeant. He is later promoted to tech sergeant for leading the men during a field exercise.

Several days later, the boys break into the gambling house at night and are discovered by Jolly Joe and his gang.  A fight ensues, but two Marine intelligence officers arrive in time to arrest the criminals.  Sach, having been framed for having a girl in the barracks is stripped of his promotions, but a new colonel is now in charge and fought with a soldier named 'Wildcat' Terry Mahoney.  Under the guise of being a relation, Slip is promoted and promptly gets even with Sach by taking him on a long drill before letting on that he has no idea who 'Wildcat' Mahoney is.

Cast

The Bowery Boys
Leo Gorcey as Terrance Aloysius 'Slip' Mahoney
Huntz Hall as Horace Debussy 'Sach' Jones
David Gorcey as Chuck (Credited as David Condon)
Bennie Bartlett as Butch 
Gil Stratton, Jr. as Junior

Remaining cast
Bernard Gorcey as Louie Dumbrowski 
Hanley Stafford as Capt. Tom Brown
Arthur Space as Capt. Miller
Myrna Dell as Lulu Mae
 Riley Hill as Capt. Harlow

Production
This is the final appearance of Gil Stratton, Jr. as a member of the gang.

International release
The film was released under the title, Tell It to the Marines in the United Kingdom.

Home media
Warner Archives released the film on made-to-order DVD in the United States as part of "The Bowery Boys, Volume Four" on August 26, 2014.

References

External links

1952 comedy films
1952 films
American black-and-white films
Bowery Boys films
Monogram Pictures films
Military humor in film
Films directed by William Beaudine
Films about the United States Marine Corps
American comedy films
1950s English-language films
1950s American films